Faycal Haddadi (born 6 February 1987) is a Moroccan international footballer who plays for Chabab Mohamedia in the Botola 2.

References

1987 births
Moroccan footballers
Morocco international footballers
Footballers from Casablanca
Wydad AC players
Olympique Club de Khouribga players
SCC Mohammédia players
Botola players
Association football midfielders
Living people